Munidopsis is a genus of squat lobster. It is the second largest of all the genera of squat lobsters, after Munida, with over 200 species. Its members are mainly found on continental slopes and on abyssal plains. A few fossil species are also known, including specimens from the Campanian (Cretaceous).

Species
The described living species are as follows:

Munidopsis abbreviata (A. Milne-Edwards, 1880)
Munidopsis abdominalis (A. Milne-Edwards, 1880)
Munidopsis abyssicola Baba, 2005
Munidopsis abyssorum A. Milne-Edwards & Bouvier, 1897
Munidopsis acalipha Macpherson, 2007
Munidopsis acuminata Benedict, 1902
Munidopsis acuta (A. Milne-Edwards, 1881)
Munidopsis acutispina Benedict, 1902
Munidopsis africana Balss, 1913
Munidopsis agassizii Faxon, 1893
Munidopsis alaminos Pequegnat & Pequegnat, 1970
Munidopsis albatrossae Pequegnat & Pequegnat, 1973
Munidopsis allae Khodkina & Duris, 1989
Munidopsis alvisca Williams, 1988
Munidopsis analoga Macpherson, 2007
Munidopsis andamanica MacGilchrist, 1905
Munidopsis anemia Macpherson & Segonzac, 2005
Munidopsis antonii (Filhol, 1884)
Munidopsis arenula Macpherson, 2007
Munidopsis ariadne Macpherson, 2011
Munidopsis aries (A. Milne-Edwards, 1880)
Munidopsis arietina Alcock & Anderson, 1894
Munidopsis armata (A. Milne-Edwards, 1880)
Munidopsis aspera (Henderson, 1885)
Munidopsis austellus Macpherson, 2007
Munidopsis aurantia Lin & Chan, 2011
Munidopsis bairdii (Smith, 1884)
Munidopsis barbarae (Boone, 1927)
Munidopsis barrerai Bahamonde, 1964
Munidopsis bermudezi Chace, 1939
Munidopsis bispinata Miyake & Baba, 1970
Munidopsis bispinoculata Baba, 1988
Munidopsis bractea Ahyong, 2007
Munidopsis bracteosa Jones & Macpherson, 2007
Munidopsis bradleyi Pequegnat & Pequegnat, 1971
Munidopsis brevimanus (A. Milne-Edwards, 1880)
Munidopsis bruta Macpherson, 2007
Munidopsis calvata Macpherson, 2007
Munidopsis camelus (Ortmann, 1892)
Munidopsis carinimarginata Baba, 1988
Munidopsis carinipes Faxon, 1893
Munidopsis cascadia Ambler, 1980
Munidopsis centrina Alcock & Anderson, 1894
Munidopsis ceratophthalma Alcock, 1901
Munidopsis ceres Macpherson, 2007
Munidopsis chacei Kensley, 1968
Munidopsis chunii Balss, 1913
Munidopsis cidaris Baba, 1994
Munidopsis cochlearis Khodkina, 1973
Munidopsis colombiana Pequegnat & Pequegnat, 1971
Munidopsis comarge Taylor, Ahyong & Andreakis, 2010
Munidopsis concava Macpherson, 2007
Munidopsis cornuata Macpherson, 2007
Munidopsis crassa Smith, 1885
Munidopsis crenatirostris Baba, 1988
Munidopsis crinita Faxon, 1893
Munidopsis cubensis Chace, 1942
Munidopsis curvimana Whiteaves, 1874
Munidopsis curvirostra Whiteaves, 1874
Munidopsis cylindrophthalma (Alcock, 1894)
Munidopsis cylindropus Benedict, 1902
Munidopsis dasypus Alcock, 1894
Munidopsis debilis (Henderson, 1885)
Munidopsis demeter Macpherson, 2007
Munidopsis dentifalx Osawa, Lin & Chan, 2007
Munidopsis denudata Macpherson, 2007
Munidopsis depressa Faxon, 1893
Munidopsis dispar 
Munidopsis echinata Osawa, Lin & Chan, 2008
Munidopsis edwardsii (Wood–Mason, 1891)
Munidopsis erinacea (A. Milne-Edwards, 1880)
Munidopsis espinis Benedict, 1902
Munidopsis expansa Benedict, 1902
Munidopsis exuta Macpherson & Segonzac, 2005
Munidopsis follirostris Khodkina, 1973
Munidopsis formosa Wu & Chan, 2000
Munidopsis geyeri Pequegnat & Pequegnat, 1970
Munidopsis gibbosa Baba, 1978
Munidopsis gilli Benedict, 1902
Munidopsis glabra Pequegnat & Williams, 1995
Munidopsis gladiola Macpherson, 2007
Munidopsis goodridgii Alcock & Anderson, 1899
Munidopsis gracilis Cubelio, Tsuchida & Watanabe, 2008
Munidopsis granosa Alcock, 1901
Munidopsis granosicorium Williams & Baba, 1989
Munidopsis granulata Miyake & Baba, 1967
Munidopsis granulens Mayo, 1972
Munidopsis gulfensis Pequegnat & Pequegnat, 1970
Munidopsis guochuani 
Munidopsis hamata Faxon, 1893
Munidopsis hemingi Alcock & Anderson, 1899
Munidopsis hendersoniana Faxon, 1893
Munidopsis hirsuta Jones & Macpherson, 2007
Munidopsis hirsutissima Balss, 1913
Munidopsis hirtella Macpherson & Segonzac, 2005
Munidopsis hystrix Faxon, 1893
Munidopsis inermis Faxon, 1893
Munidopsis iridis Alcock & Anderson, 1899
Munidopsis kaiyoae Baba, 1974
Munidopsis kareenae Ahyong, 2013
Munidopsis keijii Macpherson, 2007
Munidopsis kensleyi Ahyong & Poore, 2004
Munidopsis kensmithi Jones & Macpherson, 2007
Munidopsis kermadec Cubelio, Tsuchida & Watanabe, 2007
Munidopsis kexueae 
Munidopsis kucki Baba & Camp, 1988
Munidopsis laciniosa Baba, 2005
Munidopsis laevigata (Henderson, 1885)
Munidopsis laevisquama Lin & Chan, 2011
Munidopsis latiangulata Osawa, Lin & Chan, 2006
Munidopsis laticorpus Cubelio, Tsuchida & Watanabe, 2008
Munidopsis latifrons (A. Milne-Edwards, 1880)
Munidopsis latimana Miyake & Baba, 1966
Munidopsis latirostris (Faxon, 1895)
Munidopsis lauensis Baba & de Saint Laurent, 1992
Munidopsis laurentae Macpherson & Segonzac, 2005
Munidopsis lentigo Williams & Van Dover, 1983
Munidopsis lenzii Balss, 1913
Munidopsis leptotes Macpherson, 2007
Munidopsis levis (Alcock & Anderson, 1894)
Munidopsis lignaria Williams & Baba, 1989
Munidopsis livida (Perrier, 1886)
Munidopsis longimanus (A. Milne-Edwards, 1880)
Munidopsis longispinosa Cubelio, Tsuchida & Watanabe, 2007
Munidopsis lophia Macpherson, 2007
Munidopsis mandelai Macpherson, Amon & Clark, 2014
Munidopsis margarita Faxon, 1893
Munidopsis marginata (Henderson, 1885)
Munidopsis marianica Williams & Baba, 1989
Munidopsis marionis (A. Milne-Edwards, 1881)
Munidopsis maunga Schnabel & Bruce, 2006
Munidopsis miersii (Henderson, 1885)
Munidopsis milleri Henderson, 1885
Munidopsis mina Benedict, 1902
Munidopsis modesta Benedict, 1902
Munidopsis moresbyi Alcock & Anderson, 1899
Munidopsis myojinensis Cubelio, Tsuchida, Hendrickx, Kado & Watanabe, 2007
Munidopsis naginata Cubelio, Tsuchida & Watanabe, 2007
Munidopsis nereidis Macpherson, 2007
Munidopsis nitida (A. Milne-Edwards, 1880)
Munidopsis norfanz Ahyong, 2007
Munidopsis opalescens Benedict, 1902
Munidopsis orcina McArdle, 1901
Munidopsis ornata Faxon, 1893
Munidopsis pallida Alcock, 1894
Munidopsis palmatus Khodkina, 1973
Munidopsis panamae Baba, 2005
Munidopsis papanui Schnabel & Bruce, 2006
Munidopsis parfaiti (Filhol, 1885)
Munidopsis pectinata Macpherson, 2007
Munidopsis penescabra Pequegnat & Williams, 1995
Munidopsis pericalla Macpherson, 2007
Munidopsis petalorhyncha Baba, 2005
Munidopsis petila Baba, 2005
Munidopsis pilosa Henderson, 1885
Munidopsis platirostris (A. Milne-Edwards & Bouvier, 1894)
Munidopsis plumatisetigera Baba, 1988
Munidopsis polita (Smith, 1883)
Munidopsis polymorpha Koelbel, 1892
Munidopsis poseidonia Alcock & Anderson, 1894
Munidopsis proales Ahyong & Poore, 2004
Munidopsis producta Baba, 2005
Munidopsis profunda Baba, 2005
Munidopsis pubescens Macpherson, 2007
Munidopsis pycnopoda Baba, 2005
Munidopsis quadrata Faxon, 1893
Munidopsis ramahtaylorae Pequegnat & Pequegnat, 1971
Munidopsis recta Baba, 2005
Munidopsis regia Alcock & Anderson, 1894
Munidopsis reynoldsi (A. Milne-Edwards, 1880)
Munidopsis riveroi Chace, 1939
Munidopsis robusta (A. Milne-Edwards, 1880)
Munidopsis rotundior Baba, 2005
Munidopsis ryukyuensis Cubelio, Tsuchida & Watanabe, 2007
Munidopsis sarissa Lin, Osawa & Chan, 2007
Munidopsis scabra Faxon, 1893
Munidopsis scobina Alcock, 1894
Munidopsis scotti Jones & Macpherson, 2007
Munidopsis segonzaci Jones & Macpherson, 2007
Munidopsis sericea Faxon, 1893
Munidopsis serratifrons (A. Milne-Edwards, 1880)
Munidopsis serricornis (Lovén, 1852)
Munidopsis sharreri (A. Milne-Edwards, 1880)
Munidopsis sigsbei (A. Milne-Edwards, 1880)
Munidopsis similior Baba, 1988
Munidopsis similis Smith, 1885
Munidopsis simplex (A. Milne-Edwards, 1880)
Munidopsis sinclairi McArdle, 1901
Munidopsis snelliusae Baba, 1977
Munidopsis solidissima Macpherson, 2007
Munidopsis sonne Baba, 1995
Munidopsis spinifer (A. Milne-Edwards, 1880)
Munidopsis spinihirsuta Lloyd, 1907
Munidopsis spinipes MacGilchrist, 1905
Munidopsis spinoculata (A. Milne-Edwards, 1880)
Munidopsis spissata Macpherson, 2007
Munidopsis squamosa (A. Milne-Edwards, 1880)
Munidopsis starmer Baba & de Saint Laurent, 1992
Munidopsis strigula Macpherson, 2007
Munidopsis stylirostris Wood-Mason, 1891
Munidopsis subchelata Balss, 1913
Munidopsis subspinoculata Pequegnat & Pequegnat, 1971
Munidopsis subsquamosa Henderson, 1885
Munidopsis tafrii Osawa, Lin & Chan, 2006
Munidopsis taiwanica Osawa, Lin & Chan, 2008
Munidopsis talismani A. Milne-Edwards & Bouvier, 1894
Munidopsis tanneri Faxon, 1893
Munidopsis tasmaniae Ahyong & Poore, 2004
Munidopsis taurulus Ortmann, 1892
Munidopsis teretis Baba, 2005
Munidopsis ternaria Macpherson, 2007
Munidopsis thieli Türkay, 1975
Munidopsis tiburon Jones & Macpherson, 2007
Munidopsis townsendi Benedict, 1902
Munidopsis trachypus Alcock & Anderson, 1894
Munidopsis transtridens Pequegnat & Pequegnat, 1971
Munidopsis treis Ahyong & Poore, 2004
Munidopsis trichodes Macpherson, 2007
Munidopsis tridens (A. Milne-Edwards, 1880)
Munidopsis trifida Henderson, 1885
Munidopsis tropeorhyncha Miyake & Baba, 1970
Munidopsis truculenta Macpherson & Segonzac, 2005
Munidopsis tuberipes Komai, 2011
Munidopsis tuberosa Osawa, Lin & Chan, 2008
Munidopsis tuftsi Ambler, 1980
Munidopsis unguifera Alcock & Anderson, 1894
Munidopsis vaillantii (A. Milne-Edwards, 1881)
Munidopsis verrilli Benedict, 1902
Munidopsis verrucosus Khodkina, 1973
Munidopsis vesper Taylor, Ahyong & Andreakis, 2010
Munidopsis vicina Faxon, 1893
Munidopsis victoriae Baba & Poore, 2002
Munidopsis villosa Faxon, 1893
Munidopsis vrijenhoeki Jones & Macpherson, 2007
Munidopsis wardeni Anderson, 1896
Munidopsis yaquinensis Ambler, 1980
Munidopsis zarazagai Macpherson, 2007

References

Further reading

Squat lobsters
Extant Campanian first appearances